Campaign Workers Guild (CWG) is an American labor union. CWG represents workers on political campaigns, state parties, political consulting firms, non-profits, and other workplaces. The union advocates for higher wages, more reasonable work schedules, and improved practices to prevent sexual harassment on campaigns.

CWG was founded in early 2017 by current and former campaign workers. Notable campaigns whose staff unionized with CWG include Alexandria Ocasio-Cortez, Julian Castro, Pramila Jayapal, Deb Haaland, Randy Bryce, and Cynthia Nixon, among others.

References 

Trade unions in the United States
Political campaigns
Organizations based in Washington, D.C.
Trade unions established in 2017